Ballechin distillery was a Scotch whisky distillery operated between 1810 and 1927 and was one of seven original farm distilleries operating in Perthshire. Out of these seven, Edradour is the only one remaining.

Later in life the distillery was operated by the Robertson Family and supplied a large range of customers both locally and to wine merchants in Edinburgh and Glasgow. The distillery eventually closed due to the diversion of the water source and demolished. Since 2002, Edradour have resurrected the Ballechin brand of whisky.

The main residence on the estate was Ballechin House

References

External links
, Royal Mile Whiskies

Buildings and structures in Perth and Kinross